Dinesh Chandra Yadav (died 14 January 2021) was a member of 2nd Nepalese Constituent Assembly.

Biography
He won Banke–2 seat in 2013 Constituent Assembly election from Communist Party of Nepal (Unified Marxist–Leninist).

He tested positive for COVID-19 during the COVID-19 pandemic in Nepal on 27 December 2020, and died while undergoing treatment for the disease on January 14, 2021.

References

Communist Party of Nepal (Unified Marxist–Leninist) politicians
2021 deaths
Year of birth missing
Deaths from the COVID-19 pandemic in Nepal
Members of the 2nd Nepalese Constituent Assembly